Garcia Live Volume 10 is a two-CD live album by the Jerry Garcia Band. It contains the complete concert recorded on May 20, 1990 at the Hilo Civic Auditorium in Hilo, Hawaii. It was released on February 23, 2018.

From February 1986 to November 1993, the lineup of the Jerry Garcia Band was Jerry Garcia (guitar, lead vocals), Melvin Seals (keyboards), John Kahn (bass), David Kemper (drums), Jaclyn LaBranch (backing vocals), and Gloria Jones (backing vocals).

Critical reception
On AllMusic, Timothy Monger said, "...  this May 20, 1990 show held at the Hilo Civic Auditorium was a benefit for the Ocean Recreational Council of Hawaii.... the show offers some JGB standards like the Marvin Gaye classic "How Sweet It Is (To Be Loved by You)" and the Hunter-Garcia tune "They Love Each Other" alongside reggae covers by Peter Tosh and Jimmy Cliff. Some additional contemporary covers also graced this set, like Los Lobos' "Evangeline" and Bruce Cockburn's "Waiting for a Miracle", as well as a unique cover of the Dylan/Band classic "Tears of Rage".

Track listing
Disc 1
First set:
"How Sweet It Is (To Be Loved by You)" (Lamont Dozier, Brian Holland, Eddie Holland) – 6:20
"They Love Each Other" (Jerry Garcia, Robert Hunter) – 7:09
"Tough Mama" (Bob Dylan) – 5:16
"Like a Road Leading Home" (Don Nix, Dan Penn) – 8:14
"Run for the Roses" (Garcia, Hunter) – 5:39
"The Way You Do the Things You Do" (Smokey Robinson, Bobby Rogers) – 10:06
"My Sisters and Brothers" (Charles Johnson) – 4:13
"Knockin' on Heaven's Door" (Dylan) – 10:07
"Deal" (Garcia, Hunter) – 8:21
Disc 2
Second set:
"The Harder They Come" (Jimmy Cliff) – 10:55
"Forever Young" (Dylan) – 8:24
"Stop That Train" (Peter Tosh) – 7:10
"Tore Up over You" (Hank Ballard) – 7:24
"Tears of Rage" (Dylan, Richard Manuel) – 7:47
"Evangeline" (David Hidalgo, Louie Pérez) – 4:01
"Waiting for a Miracle" (Bruce Cockburn) – 6:19
"That Lucky Old Sun" (Haven Gillespie, Beasley Smith) – 9:37
"Tangled Up in Blue" (Dylan) – 9:40

Personnel
Jerry Garcia Band
Jerry Garcia – guitar, vocals
Gloria Jones – vocals
John Kahn – bass
David Kemper – drums
Jaclyn LaBranch – vocals
Melvin Seals – keyboards
Production
Produced for release by Marc Allan, Kevin Monty
Original recordings produced by Jerry Garcia
Recording: John Cutler
Mastering: Fred Kevorkian
Design and illustration: Ryan Corey
Liner notes: Dennis McNally
Photos: Bill Smythe 
Project coordination: Lauren Goetzinger

Charts

References

Jerry Garcia Band live albums
2018 live albums